The Coode Peninsula is a small peninsula on the inner side of the larger Malaspina Peninsula in the Sunshine Coast area of the South Coast of British Columbia, Canada, projecting into Malaspina Inlet just south of Okeover Inlet.

Name origin
Another name attribution is from Sir John Coode, nephew of Vice-Admiral Charles Vinicombe Penrose and first lieutenant of  under Captain Pender.

See also
 Coode

References

Sunshine Coast (British Columbia)
Peninsulas of British Columbia